Andrey Ivanovich Denisov (born October 3, 1952) is a Russian diplomat, who served as the Russian Ambassador to China from  to . He is fluent in Chinese, as well as English, apart from his native language.

Career Timeline
From 1973 to 1981, he was translator, as well as an economic and trade representative of the Soviet Union in China.
From 1981 to 1991,  Expert of the International Department of the Central Committee of the CPSU in the People's Republic of China.
From 1992 to 1997, he served as a senior counselor at the Russian Embassy in China.
During the 1997 to 2000 period, he was the Director of the Economic Cooperation Department of the Ministry of Foreign Affairs of Russia.
During that same time, he concurrently served as a member of the administrative board of the Ministry of Foreign Affairs of Russia.
From May 2000 to December 2001 he was the Russian Ambassador to Egypt.
From December 2001 to July 2004 he was the Deputy Minister of Foreign Affairs.
From 2004 to 2006 he was the Permanent Representative of Russia to the United Nations.
From 2006 to 2013 he was the First Deputy Foreign Minister of the Russian Federation.
From 2013 to 2022 — ambassador Extraordinary and Plenipotentiary of the Russian Federation to the People's Republic of China.
Since 2022 — senator from the executive branch of the Saratov region.

Sanctions
In December 2022 the EU sanctioned Andrey Denisov in relation to the 2022 Russian invasion of Ukraine.

Awards and honors
 Order of Merit to the Fatherland, 3rd class (21 March 2022)
 Order of Merit to the Fatherland, 4th class (9 October 2007)
 Order of Honour (29 October 2010)
 Order of Friendship (30 December 2012)
 Medal "For Merit in Perpetuating the Memory of the Fallen Defenders of the Fatherland" (2008)
 Russian Federation Presidential Certificate of Honour (29 September 2008)
 Honorary Diploma of the Government of the Russian Federation (18 September 2002)
 Gratitude of the President of the Russian Federation (3 April 2008)

Footnotes

Living people
1952 births
People from Kharkiv
Moscow State Institute of International Relations alumni
Soviet diplomats
Ambassador Extraordinary and Plenipotentiary (Russian Federation)
Permanent Representatives of Russia to the United Nations
Ambassadors of Russia to Egypt
Ambassadors of Russia to China
Recipients of the Order "For Merit to the Fatherland", 4th class
Recipients of the Order "For Merit to the Fatherland", 3rd class
Recipients of the Order of Honour (Russia)
Members of the Federation Council of Russia (after 2000)
Russian individuals subject to European Union sanctions